The Hofkriegsrat (or Aulic War Council, sometimes Imperial War Council) established in 1556 was the central military administrative authority of the Habsburg monarchy until 1848 and the predecessor of the Austro-Hungarian Ministry of War. The agency was directly subordinated to the Habsburg emperors with its seat in Vienna.

History
Permanent councils of war had already been summoned by the Habsburg emperor Maximilian I about 1500. The council was initially called a regiment, and later a secret body, state government, court council or state council. In 1529 it was considered necessary to establish an independent war council but the negotiations remained unsuccessful for a long time. On February 25, 1531, Ferdinand I issued an instruction in Linz, which ordered the compilation of an independent war council consisting of four war councilors.

Founded on 17 November 1556 in the reign of Emperor Ferdinand I, the Steter Kriegsrat (Permanent War Council) was a council of five generals and senior civil servants. It oversaw the entire Habsburg military system in war and peace and decided on fortress construction, army equipment, salary issues and the purchase of supplies, as well as the planning and implementation of wars. It also handled civil and military administration of the border region of Croatia. On 31 December 1556, all military authorities were ordered to submit to the War Council. The title Hofkriegsrat was first used in 1564. The Hofkriegsrat was in direct contact with the Imperial Chamber as the financial authority and the Imperial Chancellery as the political coordination point.

With the establishment of an imperial standing army in the 17th century, the Hofkriegsrat was the bureaucracy charged with managing the permanent military force. It served as the central military administrative agency and a military chancery, provided a staff for the emperor, and directed and coordinated field armies. Additionally, it conducted relations with the Ottoman Empire and administered the Military Frontier (Militärgrenze).

All generals had to apply for authorisation for any strategic decisions, except for the generalissimo, a rule that ensured coordinated action but proved disadvantageous facing an aggressive opponent like the Prussian king Frederick the Great. Emperor Joseph II further centralized the body and gave it supreme authority over all branches of the military administration. When the reforming Archduke Charles was appointed president of the Hofkriegsrat by Emperor Francis II in 1801, he divided the agency into three departments, dealing with military, judicial, and administrative matters.

Following the Napoleonic Wars, the Hofkriegsrat, as one of four components of the governing State Council (Staatsrat), continued to exert control over the military to the will of the Emperor of Austria. Its bureaucracy was cumbersome and decisions were often arrived at only after much argument and circulation of papers. While the presidents were always officers, section heads were frequently civilians and there was often tension between them. The military men resented interference by what Radetzky would later call a civilian "despotism". An additional problem was presented in the fact that in a time when the general staff was growing in importance in other countries (notably Prussia), in Austria it remained only a subordinate section of the Hofkriegsrat.

Amidst the growing nationalist troubles leading up to the 1848 Revolutions, the Hofkriegsrat investigated the reliability of units with suspect loyalties. In 1833 it ruled that all soldiers in the imperial army belonging to Mazzini's Italian nationalist Young Italy movement were guilty of high treason and were to be court-martialed. In the 1840s it investigated even the traditionally loyal South Slav Grenzer but determined that they would likely act as ordered, especially if in action against the Hungarians.

With effect from 1 June 1848 the Hofkriegsrat was turned into the Austrian Ministry of War. According to the Austro-Hungarian Compromise of 1867, it became one of the three common ministries of the dual monarchy.

Presidents 

 Ritter Ehrenreich von Königsberg 1556–1560
 Gebhard Freiherr von Welzer 1560–1566
 Georg Teufel, Freiherr von Guntersdorf 1566–1578
 Wilhelm Freiherr von Hofkirchen 1578–1584
 David Ungnad, Freiherr von Weißenwolf 1584–1599
 Melchior Freiherr von Redern 1599–1600
 Count Karl Ludwig Sulz 1600–1610
 Hans Freiherr von Mollard 1610–1619
 Johann Kaspar von Stadion 1619–1624
 Ramboldo, Count of Collalto 1624–1630
 Hans Christoph Freiherr von Löbel 1630–1632
 Count Heinrich Schlick 1632-1649
 Wenzel Fürst Lobkowitz, Duke of Sagan 1649–1665
 Annibale (Hannibal), Prince Gonzaga 1665–1668
 Raimondo Montecuccoli 1668–1681
 Hermann of Baden-Baden 1681–1691
 Ernst Rüdiger von Starhemberg 1692–1701
 Heinrich Franz von Mansfeld, Prince of Fondi 1701–1703
 Prince Eugene of Savoy 1703–1736
 Dominik von Königsegg-Rothenfels 1736–1738
 Johann Philipp von Harrach 1738–1761
 Count Leopold Joseph von Daun 1762–1766
 Count Franz Moritz von Lacy 1766–1774
 Count Andreas Hadik von Futak 1774–1790
 Count Michael Joseph Wallis 1791–1796
 Friedrich Moritz, Count Nostitz-Rieneck 1796
 Count Ferdinand Tige 1796–1801
 Archduke Charles, Duke of Teschen 1801–1809
 Count Heinrich von Bellegarde 1809–1813
 Karl Philipp, Prince of Schwarzenberg 1814–1820
 Count Heinrich von Bellegarde 1820–1825
 Friedrich Franz Xaver Prince of Hohenzollern-Hechingen 1825–1830
 Count Ignaz Gyulai 1830–1831
 Count Johann Maria Philipp Frimont 1831
 Ignaz Count Hardegg 1831–1848
 Count Karl Ludwig von Ficquelmont 1848

In fiction 

In Tolstoy's War and Peace, a retired Russian officer, Prince Nikolai Andreevich Bolkonski, calls it the Hof-kriegs-wurst-schnapps-rat, mocking it by adding the well-known German words Wurst (sausage) and Schnapps (booze).

". . .and that's for all the world like the old Austrian Hofkriegsrath, as far as I can judge of military matters, that is. On paper, they'd beaten Napoleon and taken him prisoner and there in their study they worked it all out in the cleverest fashion. But look you, General Mack surrendered with all his army -- he-he-he. . ."—Porfiry Petrovitch (Crime and Punishment, Dostoevsky)

Bibliography

Further reading
 Eysturlid, Lee W. The Formative Influences, Theories, and Campaigns of the Archduke Carl of Austria (Greenwood, 2000).
 Regele, Oskar. Der österreichische Hofskriegsrat, 1556-1848 (Verlag der Österreichischen Staatsdruckerei, 1949).
 Rothenberg, Gunther E. "The Croatian Military Border and the Rise of Yugoslav Nationalism." Slavonic and East European Review 43#100 (1964): 34-45.
Schwarz, Henry Frederick  and John Insley Coddington, The Imperial Privy Council in the Seventeenth Century (Oxford, 1943).

1556 establishments in the Habsburg monarchy
1848 disestablishments in the Austrian Empire
Military history of the Habsburg monarchy
Ferdinand I, Holy Roman Emperor